The Bagutta Prize is an Italian literary prize that is awarded annually to Italian writers. The prize originated among patrons of Milan's Bagutta Ristorante. The writer Riccardo Bacchelli discovered the restaurant and soon he regularly gathered numerous friends who would dine there together and discuss books. They began charging fines to the person who arrived last to an appointed meal, or who failed to appear.

At first the funds so collected were spent on miscellaneous items, but on 11 November 1927 the group decided to use the funds to create a literary prize. They named it after the restaurant.

Other directors of the prize include Emilio Tadini, Mario Soldati and Isabella Bossi Fedrigotti.

Prizewinners general prize
1927  Giovan Battista Angioletti: Il giorno del giudizio (Ribet)
1928  Giovanni Comisso: Gente di mare (Treves)
1929  Vincenzo Cardarelli: Il sole a picco (Mondadori)
1930  Gino Rocca: Gli ultimi furono i primi (Treves)
1931  Giovanni Titta Rosa: Il varco nel muro (Carabba)
1932  Leonida Rèpaci: Storia dei fratelli Rupe (Ceschina)
1933  Raul Radice: Vita comica di Corinna (Ceschina)
1934  Carlo Emilio Gadda: Il castello di Udine (Solaria)
1935  Enrico Sacchetti: Vita di artista (Treves)
1936  Silvio Negro: Vaticano minore (Hoepli)
1937-1946   Prize not awarded
1947  Dario Ortolani: Il sole bianco Garzanti)
1948  Pier Antonio Quarantotti Gambini: L'onda dell'incrociatore (Einaudi)
1949  Giulio Confalonieri: Prigionia di un artista (Genio)
1950  Vitaliano Brancati: Il bell'Antonio (Bompiani)
1951  Indro Montanelli: Pantheon minore (Longanesi)
1952  Francesco Serantini: L'osteria del gatto parlante (Garzanti)
1953  Leonardo Borghese: Primo amore (Garzanti)
1954  Giuseppe Marotta: Coraggio, guardiano (Bompiani)
1955  Alfonso Gatto: La forza degli occhi Mondadori)
1956  Giuseppe Lanza: Rosso sul lago (Cappelli)
1957  Pier Angelo Soldini: Sole e bandiere (Ceschina)
1958  Lorenzo Montano: A passo d'uomo (Rebellato)
1959  Italo Calvino: Racconti (Einaudi)
1960  
Enrico Emanuelli: Uno di New York (Mondadori) 
Antonio Barolini: Elegie di Croton, (Feltrinelli) (ex aequo)
1961  Giorgio Vigolo: Le notti romane (Bompiani)
1962  Giuseppe Dessì: Il dissertore (Feltrinelli)
1963  Ottiero Ottieri: La linea gotica (Bompiani)
1964  Tommaso Landolfi: Rien va (Vallecchi)
1965  Biagio Marin: Il non tempo del mare (Mondadori)
1966  Manlio Cancogni: La linea dei Tomori (Mondadori)
1967  Primo Levi: Storie naturali (Einaudi)
1968  Piero Chiara: Il balordo (Mondadori)
1969  Niccolò Tucci: Gli atlantici (Garzanti)
1970  Alberto Vigevani: L'invenzione (Vallecchi)
1971  Piero Gadda Conti: La paura (Ceschina)
1972  Anna Banti: Je vous écris d'un pays lointain (Mondadori)
1973  Sergio Solmi: Meditazione sullo scorpione (Adelphi)
1974  Gianni Celati: Le avventure di Guizzardi (Einaudi)
1975  Enzo Forcella: Celebrazioni d'un trentennio (Mondadori)
1976  Mario Soldati: Lo specchio inclinato (Mondadori)
1977  Sandro Penna: Stranezze (Garzanti)
1878  Carlo Cassola: L'uomo e il cane (Rizzoli)
1979  Mario Rigoni Stern: Storia di Tönle (Einaudi)
1980  Giovanni Macchia: L'angelo della notte (Rizzoli)
1981  Pietro Citati: Breve vita di Katherine Mansfield (Rizzoli)
1982  Vittorio Sereni: Il musicante di Saint-Merry (Einaudi)
1983  Giorgio Bassani: In rima e senza (Mondadori)
1984  Natalia Ginzburg: La famiglia Manzoni (Einaudi)
1985  Francesca Duranti: La casa sul lago della luna (Rizzoli)
1986  Leonardo Sciascia: Cronachette (Sellerio)
1987  Claudio Magris: Danubio (Garzanti)
1988  Luciano Erba: Il tranviere metafisico (Scheiwiller)
1989  Luigi Meneghello: Bau-sète! (Rizzoli)
1990  Fleur Jaeggy: I beati anni del castigo (Adelphi)
1991  Livio Garzanti: La fiera navigante (Garzanti)
1992  Giorgio Bocca: Il provinciale (Mondadori)
1993  Giovanni Giudici: Poesie 1953-1990 (Garzanti)
1994  Alberto Arbasino: Fratelli d'Italia (Adelphi)
1995  Daniele Del Giudice: Staccando l'ombra da terra (Einaudi)
1996  Raffaello Baldini: Ad nota (Mondadori)
1997  Sergio Ferrero: Gli occhi del padre (Mondadori)
1998  Giovanni Raboni: Tutte le poesie (1951–1993) (Garzanti)
1999  Fabio Carpi: Patchwork (Bollate Boringhieri)
2000  
 Andrea Zanzotto: Le poesie e prose scelte (Mondadori)
 Mariano Bargellini: Mus utopicus (Gallino)
2001  Serena Vitale: La casa di ghiaccio. Venti piccole storie russe (Mondadori)
2002
Roberto Calasso: La letteratura e gli dei (Adelphi)
Giorgio Orelli: Il collo dell'anitra (Garzanti)
2003
Michele Mari: Tutto il ferro della Tour Eiffel (Einaudi)
Edoardo Sanguineti: Il gatto lupesco (Feltrinelli)
Eva Cantarella: Itaca (Feltrinelli)
2004 Franco Cordero: Le strane regole del sig. B (Garzanti)
2005 Rosetta Loy: Nero è l'albero dei ricordi, azzurra l'aria (Einaudi)
2006
Filippo Tuena: Le variazioni di Reinach (Rizzoli)
Eugenio Borgna: L'attesa e la speranza (Feltrinelli)
2007 Alessandro Spina: I confini dell'ombra (Morcelliana)
2008 Andrej Longo: Dieci (Adelphi)
2009 Melania Mazzucco: La lunga attesa dell'angelo (Rizzoli)
2010 Corrado Stajano: La città degli untori (Garzanti)
2011 Andrea Bajani: Ogni Promessa (MacLehose Press for the English edition, Every Promise)
2012
 Gianfranco Calligarich: Privati abissi (Fazi editore)
 Giovanni Mariotti: Il bene viene dai morti (Edizioni Et Al.)
2013
 Antonella Tarpino: Spaesati. Luoghi dell'Italia in abbandono tra memoria e futuro (Einaudi)
2014
 Maurizio Cucchi: Malaspina (Mondadori)
 Valerio Magrelli: Geologia di un padre (Einaudi)
2015
 Sandro Veronesi: Terre rare (Bompiani)
2016
 Paolo Di Stefano: Ogni altra vita. Storia di italiani non illustri (Il Saggiatore)
 Paolo Maurensig: Teoria delle ombre (Adelphi)
2017
 Vivian Lamarque: Madre d'inverno (Mondadori)
2018
 Helena Janeczek: La ragazza con la Leica (Guanda)
2019
 Marco Balzano: Resto qui (Einaudi)
2020
 Enrico Deaglio: La bomba (Feltrinelli)
2021
 Giorgio Fontana: Prima di noi (Sellerio)
2022
 Benedetta Craveri: La contessa (Adelphi)

Prizewinners first book
1987 Franca Grisoni: La böba (San Marco dei Giustiniani) 
1991 Bruno Arpaia: I forastieri (Leonardo)
1992
Antonio Franchini: Camerati. Quattro novelle su come diventare grandi (Leonardo)
Filippo Tuena: Lo sguardo della paura (Leonardo)
1994 Laura Bosio: I dimenticati (Feltrinelli)
1995 Piero Meldini: L'avvocata delle vertigini (Adelphi)
1996
Carola Susani: Il libro di Teresa (Giunti)
Alessandro Gennari: Le ragioni del sangue (Garzanti)
1997 Patrizia Veroli: Millos (LIM)
1998  
Helena Janeczek: Lezioni di tenebra (Fazi)
Andrea Kerbaker: Fotogrammi (Scheiwiller)
1999
Tommaso Giartosio: Doppio Ritratto (Fazi)
Rosa Matteucci: Lourdes (Adelphi)
2000
Mariano Bargellini: Mus utopicus (Gallino)
Giovanni Chiara: L'agghiaccio (Marsilio)
2001
Silvia Di Natale: Kuraj (Feltrinelli)
Luigi Guarnieri: L’atlante criminale. Vita scriteriata di Cesare Lombroso (Mondadori)
2002 Paolo Maccari: Ospiti (Manni)
2003 Giuseppe Curonici: L'interruzione del Parsifal dopo il primo atto (Interlinea)
2004 Wanda Marasco: L'arciere d'infanzia (Manni)
2005 Sandro Lombardi: Gli anni felici. Realtà e memoria nel lavoro dell'attore (Garzanti)
2006 Ascanio Celestini: Storie di uno scemo di guerra (Einaudi)
2007 Pierluigi Cappello: Assetto di volo (Crocetti)
2008 Elena Varvello: L'economia delle cose (Fandango)
2009 Guido Rampoldi: La mendicante azzurra (Feltrinelli)
2010 Filippo Bologna: Come ho perso la guerra (Fandango)
2011
 Alessio Torino: Undici decimi (Italic Pequod)
 Daria Colombo: Meglio dirselo (Rizzoli) 
2012 Marco Truzzi: Non ci sono pesci rossi nelle pozzanghere (Instar)
2013 Laura Fidaleo: Dammi un posto tra gli angeli (Nottetempo)
2014 Fabrizio Passanisi: Bert il mago (Nutrimenti)
2015 Enrico Ragazzoni: Una parete sottile (Neri Pozza)
2016 Nadia Terranova: Gli anni al contrario (Einaudi)
2017 Giulia Caminito: La grande A (Giunti)
2018 Roberto Venturini: Tutte le ragazze con una certa cultura hanno almeno un poster di un quadro di Schiele appeso in camera (SEM)
2019 Marco Amerighi: Le nostre ore contate (Mondanori)
2020 Jonathan Bazzi: Febbre
2021 Alessandro Valenti: Ho provato a morire e non ci sono riuscito (Blu Atlantide)
2022 Bernardo Zannoni: I miei stupidi intenti (Sellerio)

References

A Satiric Novel of Italian Life at hull.ac.uk
Italo Calvino chronology  at des.emory.edu

Italian literary awards
Awards established in 1927
1927 establishments in Italy